Truth Be Told is American jam band Blues Traveler's seventh studio album, released on August 5, 2003.

Track listing
 "Unable to Get Free" (Chan Kinchla, John Popper, Ben Wilson) – 4:23
 "Eventually (I'll Come Around)" (Chan Kinchla, Popper) – 3:51
 "Sweet and Broken" (Christopher Barron, Popper) – 3:49
 "My Blessed Pain" (Chan Kinchla, Popper) – 4:35
 "Let Her and Let Go" (Tad Kinchla, Popper) – 3:39
 "Thinnest of Air" (Brendan Hill, Popper) – 3:35
 "Can't See Why" (Tad Kinchla, Popper) – 3:14
 "Stumble and Fall" (Chan Kinchla, Popper) – 4:59
 "This Ache" (Popper, Wilson) – 4:06
 "Mount Normal" (Popper) – 4:04
 "The One" (Chan Kinchla, Popper) – 3:42
 "Partner in Crime" (Tad Kinchla, Popper) – 3:36

Personnel
 John Popper – vocals, guitar, harmonica
 Chan Kinchla – electric and acoustic guitars, mandolin, backing vocals
 Tad Kinchla – bass
 Ben Wilson – keyboards
 Brendan Hill – drums, percussion

References

Blues Traveler albums
2003 albums
Albums produced by Don Gehman
Sanctuary Records albums